Polina is a Greek (Πωλίνα), French, Ukrainian, Russian feminine given name of Latin origin. It is sometimes a short form of the name Apollinariya, a feminine form of the ancient Greek name Apollinaris, a name derived from the Greek god Apollo. In Greek mythology Apollo was the son of Zeus and Leto and the twin of Artemis. He was the god of prophecy, medicine, music, art, law, beauty, and wisdom. Later he also became the god of the sun and light. Apollinaris is the name of several ancient Christian saints.  Saint Apollonia was an early Christian martyr venerated in the Catholic Church and the patron saint of dentists and those battling problems with their teeth.

Polina could also be seen as a variant spelling of the name Paulina, a feminine form of the name Paul or Paulus, or Pauline which is a French form of Paulina, a female version of Paulinus, a variant of Paulus meaning the little, hence the younger. 

The corresponding form for the name in Italian is Paolina (Paula corresponds to Paola). In Russian, the corresponding name is Полина (pronounced Palina). A Finnish form of the name is Pauliina; in Greece it is Παυλίνα or Πωλίνα (Paulina, pronounced Pavleena or Paulina, Poleena). In French, other diminutives of Paula exist, namely Paulette and Pauletta.

The name Polina is ranked on the 5,384th position of the most used names. It means that this name is commonly used. It's estimated that there are at least 55600 persons in the world having this name which is around 0.001% of the population. Polina was the second most popular name given to baby girls born in Moscow, Russia in 2007.

Notable people with this name 
Polina Anikeeva scientist
Polina Astakhova (1936–2005), Soviet/Ukrainian gymnast
Polina Bayvel scientist
Polina Chernyshova (born 1993), Russian theater and film actress
Polina Edmunds (born 1998), American figure skater
Polina Gagarina (born 1987), Russian singer
Polina Gelman (1919–2005), Soviet Air Force pilot
Polina Kalsina (born 1989), Russian cross-country skier
Polina Khonina (born 1998), Russian gymnast
Polina Kostiukovich (born 2003), Russian skater
Polina Kouklina (born 1986), Russian fashion model
Polina Misailidou, Greek singer
Polina Nemirovskaia (born 1995), Russia human rights advocate
Polina Pastirchak (born 1982), Hungarian opera singer
Polina Popova (born 1995), Russian model and beauty pageant titleholder
Polina Semionova (born 1984), Russian ballerina
Polina Seronosova (born 1993), Belarusian cross-country skier
Polina Shelepen (born 1995), Russian figure skater
Polina Shmatko (born 2003), Russian rhythmic gymnast
Polina Smolova (born 1980), Belarusian pop singer
Polina Tsurskaya (born 2001), Russian figure skater
Polina Zhemchuzhina (1897–1970), Soviet politician, wife of Foreign Minister Molotov

References

Greek feminine given names